Alberto Sebastián Assis Silva (born 4 March 1993) is an Uruguayan professional footballer who plays as a midfielder for Orense.

Professional career
Assis made his professional debut with Tacuarembó in a 2-1 Uruguayan Segunda División loss to Rocha on 13 October 2013. On 13 January 2020, Assis joined Unión Santa Fe on a one-year contract.

References

External links
 

1993 births
Living people
People from Tacuarembó
Uruguayan footballers
Uruguayan expatriate footballers
Association football forwards
Tacuarembó F.C. players
Cerro Largo F.C. players
Unión de Santa Fe footballers
Orense S.C. players
Argentine Primera División players
Uruguayan Primera División players
Ecuadorian Serie A players
Uruguayan expatriate sportspeople in Argentina
Uruguayan expatriate sportspeople in Ecuador
Expatriate footballers in Argentina
Expatriate footballers in Ecuador